Christian Ulrik Kastrup (1784 – 6 September 1850) was a Norwegian jurist, military officer and politician.

A jurist by education, from Stavanger, he worked as a military officer until 1811, when he became chief of customs in Vardø. In 1817 he became fut in the district Nordhordland og Voss. He was elected to the Norwegian Parliament from Søndre Bergenhus in 1821, 1822 and 1824. Political parties did not exist at the time.

He became County Governor of Finnmarkens amt in 1828, of Stavangers amt in 1829 and of Nordre Bergenhus amt in 1833. Originally governing from the market town of Bergen, he moved to Lærdalsøyri in 1840, becoming the second Nordre Bergenhus county governor to actually live in the county. He held the position until 1844.

References
Christian Ulrik Kastrup at the NRK Sogn og Fjordane County Encyclopedia

1784 births
1850 deaths
County governors of Norway
Norwegian Army personnel
Norwegian military personnel of the Napoleonic Wars
Members of the Storting